Now Deh-e Meyrmaharab (also Romanized as Now Deh-e Meyrmaḥarāb; also known as Now Deh) is a village in Zibad Rural District, Kakhk District, Gonabad County, Razavi Khorasan Province, Iran. At the 2006 census, its population was 152, in 54 families.

References 

Populated places in Gonabad County